Weldon Leo "Jack" Teagarden (August 20, 1905 – January 15, 1964) was an American jazz trombonist and singer. According to critic Scott Yannow of Allmusic, Teagarden was the preeminent American jazz trombone player before the bebop era of the 1940s and "one of the best jazz singers too". Teagarden's early career was as a sideman with the likes of Paul Whiteman and lifelong friend Louis Armstrong.

Early life
Teagarden was born in Vernon, Texas, United States. His brothers Charlie and Clois "Cub" and his sister Norma also became professional musicians. His father was an amateur brass band trumpeter and started him on baritone horn; by age seven he had switched to trombone. His first public performances were in movie theaters, where he accompanied his mother, a pianist.

Music career

Teagarden's trombone style was largely self-taught, and he developed many unusual alternative positions and novel special effects on the instrument. He is usually considered the most innovative jazz trombone stylist of the pre-bebop era – Pee Wee Russell once called him "the best trombone player in the world".

By 1920, Teagarden was playing professionally in San Antonio, including with the band of pianist Peck Kelley. In the mid-1920s he started traveling widely around the United States in a quick succession of different bands. In 1927, he went to New York City where he worked with several bands. By 1928 he played for the Ben Pollack band.

In the late 1920s, he recorded with such bandleaders and sidemen as Armstrong, Benny Goodman, Bix Beiderbecke, Red Nichols, Jimmy McPartland, Mezz Mezzrow, Glenn Miller, Eddie Condon, and Fats Waller. In 1931, Teagarden’s early orchestra recorded the tune “Chances Are” with Fats Waller playing piano and Jack singing and playing trombone. Miller and Teagarden collaborated to provide lyrics and a verse to Spencer Williams' "Basin Street Blues", which in that amended form became one of the numbers that Teagarden played until the end of his days.

Teagarden sought financial security during the Great Depression and signed an exclusive contract to play for the Paul Whiteman Orchestra from 1933 through 1938. In 1946, Teagarden joined Louis Armstrong's All Stars. In late 1951, Teagarden left to again lead his own band.

He died in New Orleans at the age of 58, suffering from pneumonia.

Discography

 Big Jazz with Rex Stewart (Atlantic, 1953)
 Holiday in Trombone (EmArcy, 1954)
 Jack Teagarden Plays and Sings (Urania, 1954)
 Meet the New Jack Teagarden Volume I (Urania, 1954)
 Jazz Great (Bethlehem, 1955)
 Accent On Trombone (Urania, 1955)
 Big T's Jazz (Decca, 1956)
 This Is Teagarden! (Capitol, 1956)
 Swing Low, Sweet Spiritual (Capitol, 1957)
 Jazz Ultimate with Bobby Hackett (Capitol, 1958)
 Jack Teagarden at the Roundtable (Roulette, 1959)
 Shades of Night (Capitol, 1959)
 Mis'ry and the Blues (Verve, 1961)
 Think Well of Me (Verve, 1962)
 The Dixie Sound of Jack Teagarden (Roulette, 1962)
 Jack Teagarden (Verve, 1962)
 The Blues and Dixie (Rondo-lette, 1963)
 A Portrait of Mr. T (Roulette, 1963)
 Swinging Down in Dixie (Golden Tone, 1963)
 King of the Blues Trombone (Epic, 1963)
 Big T's Dixieland Band (Capitol, 1977)
 Big T & the Condon Gang (Pumpkin, 1978)
 Original Dixieland (Everest Archive, 1978)
 Big Band Jazz (Everest Archive, 1979)
 Mighty Like a Rose (Koala, 1979)
 The Swingin' Gate (Jasmine, 1981)
 The Big Band Sound of Bunny Berigan & Jack Teagarden (Folkways, 1982)
 Tribute to Teagarden (Pausa, 1983)
 Birth of a Band (Giants of Jazz, 1985)
 100 Years from Today (Grudge, 1990)
 The Complete Capitol Fifties Jack Teagarden Sessions (Mosaic, 1996)
 It's Time for T (Naxos, 2006)
 Father of Jazz Trombone (Avid Entertainment, 2004)

As guest
 Red Allen, Red Allen, Kid Ory & Jack Teagarden at Newport (Verve, 1957)
 Ben Pollack, Dixieland (Savoy, 1956)

See also
Red River Valley Museum

References

External links
 

 Jack Teagarden recordings at the Discography of American Historical Recordings.

1905 births
1964 deaths
People from Vernon, Texas
Jazz musicians from Texas
Burials at Forest Lawn Memorial Park (Glendale)
Burials at Forest Lawn Memorial Park (Hollywood Hills)
20th-century American musicians
20th-century American male musicians
20th-century trombonists
American jazz trombonists
Big band bandleaders
Dixieland trombonists
Mainstream jazz trombonists
American male jazz musicians
Male trombonists
McKenzie and Condon's Chicagoans members
RCA Victor artists
Swing trombonists
The Charleston Chasers members
The Dorsey Brothers members